D50 in medicine is the half-maximal dose: the dose that produces 50% of the maximum response.  It may specifically refer to the radiation dose required to achieve a 50% tumor control probability.

See also 
 , is the dose required to kill half the members of a tested population after a specified test duration.

References

Radiation therapy